Smorodino is a rural locality (a selo) and the administrative center of Smorodinskoye Rural Settlement, Yakovlevsky District, Belgorod Oblast, Russia. The population was 517 as of 2010. There are 10 streets.

Geography 
Smorodino is located 7 km northeast of Stroitel (the district's administrative centre) by road. Kamensky is the nearest rural locality.

References 

Rural localities in Yakovlevsky District, Belgorod Oblast